The 1979 USA Outdoor Track and Field Championships took place between June 16–17 at Hilmer Lodge Stadium on the campus of Mt. San Antonio College in Walnut, California. The decathlon took place on June 3–4. This was the last time the meet was organized by the AAU. Their status as the national governing body was terminated at the end of the year as a result of the Amateur Sports Act of 1978. They were replaced by the newly formed organization The Athletics Congress, hosting the meet at this same location.

Results

Men track events

Men field events

Women track events

Women field events

See also
United States Olympic Trials (track and field)

References

 Results from T&FN
 results

USA Outdoor Track and Field Championships
Usa Outdoor Track And Field Championships, 1979
Track and field
Track and field in California
Outdoor Track and Field Championships
Outdoor Track and Field Championships
Sports competitions in California